IPSC Barbados is the Barbadian association for practical shooting under the International Practical Shooting Confederation.

References

External links 
 Official homepage of IPSC Barbados

Regions of the International Practical Shooting Confederation
Sports governing bodies in Barbados